Grandpa's Journey is a 1993 Swedish drama film directed by Staffan Lamm. Marika Lagercrantz was nominated for the award for Best Actress at the 29th Guldbagge Awards.

Cast
 Max von Sydow as Simon S.L. Fromm
 Mai Zetterling as Elin Fromm
 Marika Lagercrantz as Karin
 Carl Svensson as Göran
 Ina-Miriam Rosenbaum as Vera
 Sharon Brauner as Sara
 Hagen Müller-Stahl as Dr. Bratt
 Bernhard-Heinrich Herzog as Student (as Bernhard Heinrich Herzog)
 Svante Weyler as Post-office Employee
 Annmari Kastrup as Astrid

References

External links
 
 

1993 films
1993 drama films
Swedish drama films
1990s Swedish-language films
1990s Swedish films